Mobile station was a train station in Mobile, Alabama. It was built in 1956 and demolished in 2007.

History

Built in 1956 by the Louisville & Nashville Railroad, it replaced an earlier station on the same site. 

Former Louisville & Nashville services which utilized the station included the Pan-American (discontinued, 1971) and Humming Bird (discontinued, 1969). Through an agreement between the two rail companies, until 1970, the Southern Railway operated the Crescent through Mobile. Until 1971, the L&N operated the New Orleans–Jacksonville, Florida Gulf Wind through the station in cooperation with the Seaboard Coast Line (prior to 1967, Seaboard Air Line). In previous years the company additionally operated the New Orleans-Florida Limited, replete with diner and sleeper service, that made the trip during daylight hours in Florida for most of the route.

Amtrak service began with the Gulf Coast Limited, which operated between 1984 and 1985 and called at the station. Mobile then served as the southern terminus of the Gulf Breeze train starting in 1989. The Sunset Limited began stopping here in 1993, and the Gulf Breeze was discontinued in 1995. In 2005, Hurricane Katrina flooded the station and Amtrak discontinued the Sunset Limited east of New Orleans.

In 2006, CSX sold the property to a developer, who razed the station in 2007. The site plan provides for a future station nearby. Amtrak announced in 2016 that plans for a return of the Sunset Limited were under consideration. In 2021, Amtrak announced the possibility of restoring service as early as 2023.

See also
Mobile station (Gulf, Mobile and Ohio)

References

External links

Mobile Amtrak Station (USA Rail Guide -- Train Web)

Former Amtrak stations in Alabama
Transportation in Mobile, Alabama
Former Louisville and Nashville Railroad stations
Buildings and structures in Mobile, Alabama
Transportation in Mobile County, Alabama
Demolished railway stations in the United States
1956 establishments in Mississippi
Railway stations in the United States opened in 1956
Railway stations closed in 1971
Railway stations in the United States opened in 1984
Railway stations closed in 1985
Railway stations in the United States opened in 1989
Railway stations closed in 2005